Cyperus dipsaceus is a species of sedge that is native to southern North America.

See also 
 List of Cyperus species

References 

dipsaceus
Plants described in 1850
Flora of Mexico
Flora of Arizona
Taxa named by Frederik Liebmann